Produce 101 – Final is an EP by contestants of the South Korean survival show Produce 101 Season 2. It was released online for download on June 17, 2017, by CJ E&M.

Track listing

Sales

References

2017 compilation albums
K-pop albums
Korean-language compilation albums
Produce 101